Pori railway station is a railway station in Pori, Finland. It has VR service to Tampere and to Port of Pori. Since Pori is a terminal passenger station, the traffic is quite moderate. Pori railway station serves approximately 225,000 people annually.

History 
Tampere–Pori railway and the first railway station in Pori were opened in 1895. This station was destroyed in the 1918 Finnish Civil War and replaced a year later with a new one. The present railway station was constructed 1938 in a different location. Functionalism-style building was designed by Finnish architect Thure Hellström.

Haapamäki–Pori railway was opened along with the new station in 1938. It was connecting Pori with Central Finland but the traffic ceased in 1985.

External links 
 
 Pori railway station at VR Group Official Homepage (in Finnish)

Railway stations in Satakunta
Buildings and structures in Pori
Railway stations opened in 1895
Art Deco architecture in Finland
Art Deco railway stations